Ralph Shealy Kennedy Jr. (born October 21, 1958) is an American politician. He is a former member of the South Carolina House of Representatives from the 39th District, serving from 2010 until 2017. He is a member of the Republican party.

References

Living people
1958 births
Republican Party members of the South Carolina House of Representatives
21st-century American politicians